The Fantanas are a group of spokesmodels (later dancers) who were created to promote the Fanta brand of soft drinks in the United States. The quartet has appeared since 2002 in advertising and personal appearances. There have been five different Fantanas rosters, the latter reintroduced as a co-ed dance ensemble in 2017. Their jingle is "Wanna Fanta! Don't you wanna?".

The "story" behind the Fantanas
According to the Fantanas' website, they lived on Fantana Island and were accidentally discovered by an entertainment mogul named Sir Juan-Carlos Martinez III after he fell off his yacht and was washed ashore on that island, seeing their work. He later talked with an advertising mogul, Paul Gurbel, in a fictional New York restaurant who brought them to the United States. In reality, the advertisements were created by Ogilvy and Mather in 2002.

Incarnations

Original Fantanas (2002–2004)

The original lineup of Fantanas donned an island/party style. The members (with their real names) were:
Nina (K.D. Aubert) - red (strawberry Fanta)
Calli (Jennifer Diaz) - orange (orange Fanta)
Leelee (Adrienne Janic) - yellow (pineapple Fanta)
Raquel (Andrea De Oliveira) - purple (grape Fanta)

They gained attention outside their advertisements for their campiness and use of sexuality, and these original four were featured in a Maxim magazine spread in December 2002.

"Mod" Fantanas (2004–2006)

In 2004, the Fantanas returned with a new look inspired by the mod fashion styles of the late 1960s. The members (some real names being withheld or unknown) were:
Capri (Kat Graham) - red (strawberry Fanta)
Kiki - orange (orange Fanta); leader
Lola - yellow (pineapple Fanta)
Sophia (Monica Flores) - purple (grape Fanta)

"Party" Fantanas (2006–2009)

In 2006, the next-generation lineup of Fantanas was introduced, this time with a contemporary party look. The commercials featuring this Fantanas roster were filmed in Argentina. The members (some real names being withheld or unknown) were:
Kaia (Danielle Acoff) - red (strawberry Fanta)
Amie (Dena Cali) - orange (orange Fanta); leader
Mimi (Mimi Karsh) - yellow (pineapple Fanta)
Sophia (Monica Flores) - purple (grape Fanta); character held over from the second incarnation

Return of the Fantanas (2009–2011)

In April 2009, it was announced that New Fantanas would be advertising the drinks with the original Fanta flavors. Each of the Fantanas would have an individual fashion style. The lineup of the Fantanas had these members (some real names being withheld or unknown):
Summer (Diana Carr) - orange (orange Fanta); indie, healthy hippie style, leader.
Melody (Katherine Wilkes) - purple (grape Fanta); music-loving, punk, rockstar style.
Isabela (Marilinda Rivera) - red (strawberry Fanta); fashionable, sexy, red-hot style.
Lily (Brittany Hampton) - yellow (pineapple Fanta); cute, chic style. Brittany was voted the winner of the 4th Fantana Search in Summer/Fall 2010. Replaced Shakira Barrera.

"Be More Than One Flavor" Fantanas (2017–present)
In 2017, Fanta reintroduced the Fantanas with a modern style and encourages consumers to "be more than one flavor". It is the first time the group includes a male member.
Eva (Eva Gutowski) - orange (orange Fanta)
Coco (Coco Jones) - purple (grape Fanta)
Jordan (Jordan Fisher) - red (strawberry Fanta)
Lauren (Lauren Riihimaki) - yellow (pineapple Fanta)

MADtv parody
The Fantanas were twice parodied on the sketch comedy series MADtv.

Both appearances (Episodes #1004 and #1009, aired 6 November and 18 December 2004, respectively) starred Daniele Gaither as Capri, Stephnie Weir as Lola, Nicole Parker as Kiki, and Paul C. Vogt as "Two-Liter" Beth. The commercials were similar to the actual Fantanas commercials, with Capri, Lola and Kiki offering Fanta to a series of men, only to be interrupted by Beth's attempts to seduce the men with her two-liter bottle of an odd savory flavored Fanta (and some blurred nudity).

The former episode featured the Fantanas representing similar Fanta flavors, but the latter episode (aired just before Christmas) featured the Fantanas representing holiday-themed Fanta:
 Candy Cane Capri (Gaither)
 Cinnamon Spice Lola (Weir)
 Frosted Gingerbread Kiki (Parker)
 Holiday Ham Dinner Beth (Vogt)

Other parodies

The Fantanas also made an appearance in the popular animated show Robot Chicken in the episode "Adoption's an Option" in 2006.

In the "Peter's Daughter" episode of Family Guy, first shown on November 25, 2007, the Fantanas were parodied as four elderly women promoting Sanka.

The Australian comedian Pam Ann uses the Fantana jingle as a catchphrase when she does her routine as the Iberia Airlines stewardess Conchita Rosa María González Gómez in her shows.

Notes

External links
Fanta's website
Fantanas at TV Acres
Adrienne Janic's website
Monica Flores's website
Dena Cali's website

Mascots introduced in 2002
Advertising campaigns
Drink advertising characters
Female characters in advertising